Trademark look or signature look is the characteristic clothes or other distinguishing signs used by a certain character or performer, making the person more recognizable by the audience. Politicians may also have trademark signs, such as the suit of American President Barack Obama or the Merkel-Raute hand gesture of German Chancellor Angela Merkel. It can also refer to the clothes of a certain subculture.

Some trademark signatures may have started as in-jokes, but have then come to have been recognized by a wider audience. 

Popular personalities like Steve Jobs and Mark Zuckerberg are known for their signature look. The reason shared is to save the sheer amount of time spent on deciding what to wear daily. As fashion trends gets influenced by renowned people like them, more and more people have started to find their personal signature style. Sometimes, when a celebrity stops using a trademark look, people might even find it hard to recognize them. 

The term "trademark look" (or anything similar) is not used in trademark law and a trademark look is not necessarily trademark-protected in itself.

See also
 Catchphrase
 Leitmotif
 Signature song
 Signature weapon
 Trope (literature)
 List of filmmakers' signatures

References

Clothing
Culture
Product management
Literary motifs